Johan Zuidema (born 21 September 1948) is a former Dutch footballer. He was twice the leading scorer for FC Twente, scoring 14 goals in 1973–74 and 10 goals in 1974–75, and participated in the 1975 UEFA Cup Final.

References

1948 births
Living people
Dutch footballers
Netherlands international footballers
NEC Nijmegen players
SC Cambuur players
FC Twente players
AFC Ajax players
Eredivisie players
Eerste Divisie players
People from Dantumadiel
Footballers from Friesland
Association football forwards